Li Yonghe was a 19th-century rebel leader from Yunnan province, Qing dynasty China.

Rebellion 
In the autumn of 1859, as the Qing dynasty was plagued by the Taiping rebellion, Nian rebellion and Panthay rebellion, Li Yonghe, with two brothers Lan Chaoding and Lan Chaozhu raised a rebellion in their home province of Yunnan under the slogan "No more payment of rents, no more tribute of grain, fight the rich and aid the poor". They used the name Daming Shuntian, or "Great Ming following Heaven". Li declared himself "King-following-Heaven", while Lan Chaoding and Lan Chaozhu were declared Grand Marshal and Vice Marshal respectively. The rebel army, numbering in excess of 100,000 troops, crossed into Sichuan province, occupying more than 40 prefectures and counties and capturing the city of Mianyang. The rebel army expanded to nearly 300,000.

In 1861, Qing commander Luo Bingzhang was tasked to suppress the rebels with the newly established Xiang Army. By October 1862 Li had been defeated, captured and transported to Chengdu where he was executed. Lan Chaoding had similarly been killed in battle. The surviving rebels under Lan Chaozhu retreated northward to Shaanxi province,  where Lan was declared Dahan Xianwang, or "Manifested King of the Great Han". The rebel forces  linked up with Taiping Tianguo forces under Chen Baocai, and Lan received the title Wen Wang, or "Cultured King" from the Heavenly King. He was also defeated and killed in 1864. The total casualties of the rebellion are estimated at over 100,000.

References

19th-century Chinese people
Generals from Yunnan
Qing dynasty people
Qing dynasty rebels